Films produced in Norway in the 1950s:

1950s

External links
 Norwegian film at the Internet Movie Database

References

1950s
Norwegian
Films